Iowa State Highway Commission, District 6 Building, also known as Iowa Department of Transportation building, is a historic building located in Cedar Rapids, Iowa, United States. It is significant for its association with the Iowa Highway Commission and its role developing policy and designing and implementing highway construction projects. It is also significant for its association with the New Deal program, the Public Works Administration. Completed in 1939, it was utilized by the Iowa Department of Transportation from then until 2012. U.S. Highway 30 (US 30) aligned with 16th Ave., SW in front the building from c. 1939 until it was aligned again in 1953 to bypass Cedar Rapids. US 30 had its origins in the Lincoln Highway, which followed a different route through the city.

The architect of the building in unknown. It is a two-story brick structure built over a basement. Neoclassicism is found in its highly ordered symmetry and its decorative elements, especially the restrained fluted pilasters and rectangular spandrels. The building was listed on the National Register of Historic Places in 2017.

References

Government buildings completed in 1939
Neoclassical architecture in Iowa
Buildings and structures in Cedar Rapids, Iowa
National Register of Historic Places in Cedar Rapids, Iowa
Government buildings on the National Register of Historic Places in Iowa
Public Works Administration in Iowa